Oosterweel may refer to:

 , a village near Antwerp
 Battle of Oosterweel, 1567, traditionally viewed as the beginning of the Eighty Years' War
 Oosterweel Link, a long running proposed construction project intended to complete the Antwerp Ring Road